Murayghil is a village in northern Aleppo Governorate, northwestern Syria. Nearby localities include Rael  to the southeast and al-Judaydah (Yani Yaban)  to the south. In the 2004 census, Murayghil had a population of 157.

Demographics
The village is inhabited by Turkmen. German traveler Martin Hartmann listed the village as Turkish village in late 19th century.

References

Villages in Aleppo Governorate
Turkmen communities in Syria
Populated places in Aleppo Governorate